Lawrence Clyde Hodge (27 May 1902 – 6 January 1960) was an Australian rules footballer and captain of the Port Adelaide Football Club during the 1920s.

References

Australian rules footballers from South Australia
Port Adelaide Football Club (SANFL) players
Port Adelaide Football Club players (all competitions)
1902 births
1960 deaths